Barnardiston is a surname. Notable people with the surname include:

Nathaniel Barnardiston (1588–1653), English politician and Member of Parliament
Sir Samuel Barnardiston, 1st Baronet (1620–1707), English Whig Member of Parliament and deputy governor of the East India Company; son of Nathaniel Barnardiston
Sir Samuel Barnardiston, 2nd Baronet (1659–1709), English Member of Parliament and barrister
Sir Thomas Barnardiston, 1st Baronet (died 1669), English Member of Parliament; son of Nathaniel Barnardiston
Sir Thomas Barnardiston, 2nd Baronet (c. 1646–1698), English Member of Parliament; son of Thomas Barnardiston, 1st Baronet
Thomas Barnardiston (legal writer) (died 1752), English barrister and legal reporter

See also
Barnardiston baronets, two extinct titles in the Baronetage of England
Barnardiston family (medieval aristocracy), English medieval landholders

Surnames
English-language surnames
Surnames of English origin
Surnames of British Isles origin